Dominique Perreault (born October 26, 1984 in Montreal, Quebec) is a Canadian water polo player. She is a member of the Canada women's national water polo team that claimed the bronze medal at the 2005 World Aquatics Championships.

See also
 List of World Aquatics Championships medalists in water polo

References

External links
 

1984 births
Canadian female water polo players
French Quebecers
Living people
Water polo players from Montreal
Water polo players at the 2007 Pan American Games
Water polo players at the 2011 Pan American Games
World Aquatics Championships medalists in water polo
Pan American Games silver medalists for Canada
Pan American Games medalists in water polo
Medalists at the 2011 Pan American Games